The 1878 Rutgers Queensmen football team represented Rutgers University in the 1878 college football season. The Queensmen compiled a 1–2–1 record, scored one point, and allowed six points.

The team had no coach, and its captain was Thomas Fitz-Randolph.

Schedule

References

Rutgers
Rutgers Scarlet Knights football seasons
Rutgers Queensmen football